The 2022 DFB-Pokal Final decided the winner of the 2021–22 DFB-Pokal, the 79th season of the annual German football cup competition. The match was played on 21 May 2022 at the Olympiastadion in Berlin.

The match featured SC Freiburg and RB Leipzig, with neither side having won the competition prior.

RB Leipzig won the match 4–2 on penalties, following a 1–1 draw after extra time, for their first DFB-Pokal title. As winners, they hosted the 2022 edition of the DFL-Supercup at the start of the following season, and faced the champion of the 2021–22 edition of the Bundesliga, Bayern Munich. As Leipzig already qualified for the 2022–23 edition of the UEFA Champions League through their position in the Bundesliga, the UEFA Europa League group stage spot reserved for the cup winners went to the sixth-placed team, and the league's UEFA Europa Conference League play-off round spot to the seventh-placed team.

Teams
In the following table, finals until 1943 were in the Tschammerpokal era, since 1953 were in the DFB-Pokal era.

Background

Route to the final
The DFB-Pokal began with 64 teams in a single-elimination knockout cup competition. There were a total of five rounds leading up to the final. Teams were drawn against each other, and the winner after 90 minutes would advance. If still tied, 30 minutes of extra time was played. If the score was still level, a penalty shoot-out was used to determine the winner.

Note: In all results below, the score of the finalist is given first (H: home; A: away).

Match

Details

See also
2022 DFL-Supercup
Football in Berlin

Notes

References

External links
 

2022
2021–22 in German football cups
SC Freiburg matches
RB Leipzig matches
Football competitions in Berlin
May 2022 sports events in Germany
2022 in Berlin
DFB-Pokal Final 2022